The ELC project was a prototype light tank project launched by the French Ministry of Defense in 1955. The purpose of the ELC (Engin Léger de Combat, Light combat vehicle) project was to develop a lightly armoured, heavily armed fighting vehicle capable of being airlifted for rapid deployment.

ELC AMX series

History of creation

The idea behind the creation of the Engin Léger de Combat (French for «light combat vehicle») was to install powerful anti-tank weapons on a light but fully armored tankette and thus create a light tank destroyer that was mobile, inconspicuous, capable of hitting and destroying all types of enemy tanks at a distance of about 1 500 meters. Two prototypes built on the Hotchkiss tankette hull in the mid-1950s differed in their main armament; running gear, engine and mechanical components were basically the same for both machines.

Design

Armament

The first prototypes produced by AMX had the D.914 gun loaded with 90mm Empennée HEAT rounds (French for "feathered"). Since the firing range of the D.914 gun did not meet the requirements for the French Ministry of Defense, an elongated D.915 gun equipped with a muzzle brake was developed. Especially for this cannon, a new model of the turret called 903 was designed — it had a large capacity. The standard projectile for the D.915, marked ENERGA, weighing approximately 2 kg, was meant for penetration of 350 mm of armor, but it also had an insufficiently high effective firing range — only 600-700 meters. Later, shells of the same type were developed under the name «G»: they had a larger mass (more than 7 kg) and made it possible to achieve the originally requested effective firing range of 1 000 meters, but it was not possible to increase this range to the originally requested 1 500 meters or more at that time.

All versions of the tank had a coaxial 7.5 mm machine gun AAT-52, and on the ELC TC 904 modification, two pairs of smoke grenade launchers located on the sides of the turret were added.

Turret

A total of 4 turrets were developed for the AMX ELC. A distinctive feature of these turrets was the so-called casemate design.  On the move the turret's rotation was limited to about 36°, because with more turret rotation the driver (located on the floor of the vehicle) was unable to access the tank's controls, and he might be injured by the breech of the gun. To fully rotate the turret and aim at the target, the tank had to stop. Despite such disadvantages the setup made the tank destroyer very mobile and could aim at some targets on the move. The close location of both crew members in the turret ensured a high concentration on gun control - while the driver loaded ammunition, the tank commander fired. 

Model 902 and 904 turrets were equipped with a rangefinder for more effective engage of the enemy. The tank was equipped with AN/VRC.7 or AN/GRC.4 radio stations. Since the initial prototypes of the ELC AMX did not have the drum automation of the ammunition rack, which was widely used on French tanks at that time, the loader could choose the appropriate ammunition to hit one or another type of target, however, on the modification of the TC 904, the first-order ammo rack for four rounds was noted, which, however, only facilitated the loading of the gun.

Mobility

With an average weight of all prototypes of 6.7 tons and a 164-horsepower four-cylinder SOFAM engine, the tank reached a speed of 68 km/h on the highway and 25 km/h on the rough terrain with a specific power of 26 h.p./t. The volume of the fuel tank was 360 liters, and the cruising range on the highway was 580 kilometers. The tank had excellent off-road abilities for its size — the suspension allowed it to overcome vertical obstacles up to 0.6 m high and ditches 1.50 m wide.

ELC AMX bis

In 1956, AMX decided to increase the armor of the ELC AMX hull and strengthen the chassis, as the chassis of the CC.2 armored personnel carrier was becoming unusable due to the significantly increased weight of the vehicle. The development of the new chassis has been going on since 1957, AMX has made many different decisions to improve the tank. In 1961, a new hull was designed and manufactured with armor up to 40 mm thick, which was located at rational angles of inclination (up to 80 degrees). The new chassis was provided with five pairs of smaller diameter rollers and three return rollers. The mass of the machine has increased — it has reached 8,9 tons. The new hull contained 34 HEAT-FS and HE-FS fragmentation projectiles, another 19 were in the turret. The volume of the fuel tank, however, has slightly decreased to 340 liters as well as the cruising range — the new amount was 500 kilometers.

The armament and turret were inherited from the latest ELC AMX TC 904 prototype - the tank was fired with G-marked ammunition. The AA-52 machine gun, smoke grenades and rangefinder were also featured on the new prototype. The new engine of the car was a gasoline 4-cylinder SOFAM Type 4 GSr with a power of 180 h.p., which, with a specific power of 20 h.p./t., allowed the vehicle to reach a record for tanks of the Engin Léger de Combat project speed of 80 km/h on the highway. The average speed was about 60 km/h.

At the end of development in 1961, the Engin Léger de Combat program was recognized as unpromising, so work on the project was discontinued in favor of improving the AMX 13 light tank, and today the AMX ELC bis is on display as an exhibit in the Museum of Armored Vehicles in Saumur.

ELC EVEN series
The ELC EVEN was a series of light tanks created in competition with AMX's proposals. These prototypes featured an oscillating turret with a cupola for the gunner located along the turret centerline. The turret itself was offset to the left in order to make room for a driver's compartment in the hull.

ELC EVEN 30 

The ELC EVEN 30 was armed with twin 30mm Hispano-Suiza autocannons with fluted barrels mounted on either side of the turret, with two machine guns mounted slightly inboard of these weapons.

ELC EVEN 90 

The ELC EVEN 90 featured a turret very similar to that of the ELC EVEN 30, but replaced both 30mm guns and the right-side machinegun with a single low-pressure 90mm D919 gun using 700m/sec HEAT rounds type G, on the right side of the turret.

ELC EVEN 120 
The ELC EVEN 120 featured four 120 mm recoilless rifles arranged in horizontal pairs on either side of the turret. These weapons were to be reloaded by the driver either by rotating the turret so that the driver could open his hatch and insert new projectiles without leaving his seat, or by having the driver climb out and reload the weapons from a standing position next to the tank. It was also suggested that the rear ends of the 120mm weapons' barrels be cut so that the rear sections could be rotated into the turret, allowing the gunner to reload the weapons without opening his hatch.

Another version of the tank featuring two 120mm weapons, each with a five-round revolver-type autoloader, was suggested but not constructed.

ELC EVEN - Nord-AVIATION Missiles 
A vehicle armed with either four SS-11 ATGMs or two SS-12 SSMs mounted on arms on either side of a purpose-built welded plate turret, with an armored glass observation window on its front. A prototype featuring a combination of these weapons (two SS-11 on the right side of the turret and one SS-12 on the left) was built.

References

Light tanks of France
Light tanks of the Cold War